The Jensen-Salsbery Laboratories building in Kansas City, Missouri is a building from 1918. It was listed on the National Register of Historic Places in 1985.
Two Atlas sculptures representing Biology and Chemistry were created by Kansas City sculptor Jorgen Dreyer in 1918 on the third floor above the entry doors.

References

Prairie School architecture in Missouri
Commercial buildings completed in 1918
Buildings and structures in Kansas City, Missouri
Commercial buildings on the National Register of Historic Places in Missouri
National Register of Historic Places in Kansas City, Missouri